Orbelian's Caravanserai (also known as Sulema Caravanserai and Selim Caravanserai), is a caravanserai in the Vayots Dzor Province of Armenia. It was built along the Vardenyats Mountain Pass (also known as the Selim Mountain Pass) in 1332, by prince Chesar Orbelian to accommodate weary travelers and their animals as they crossed from, or into, the mountainous Vayots Dzor region.

Architecture 
The only entrance to the caravanserai is at the rectangular vestibule adjacent to the main hall of the structure. It has a gabled stone shingle roof that rests on three arches. On the eastern side, these arches rest upon the edges of the windows. The southern wall of the vestibule and the entry wall façade are the few locations in the caravanserai where there is any ornamentation. The entry has decorations around the half-rounded lintel, with high-reliefs of a winged animal to the left, and a bull to the right, above the lintel. The only other decorations may be found around each of the oculi in the hall, which each have a unique design.

There are two inscriptions found on the vestibule, one is written in Persian and the other is written in Armenian. The Persian inscription written upon the half-rounded lintel of the entrance has nearly been effaced by vandals, but the Armenian inscription found at the eastern interior wall, just past the entrance to the upper right is legible and reads the following:

The caravanserai is constructed of blocks of basalt. It has a single hall divided into three naves, with seven pairs of polyhedral pillars. Animals rested in the narrow aisles to the left and right of the main hall. Between the pillars were stone troughs for the animals, and in the corner of one of the halls was a pool of water. Travelers slept in a separate room built at the end of the narrow aisles on the western side of the caravanserai. The roof above the three-aisled hall had three parallel vaults with an oculus in each.  The vaults were supported by arches that stretched from pillar to pillar along the aisles, and traversed from the pillars to the walls. Oculi placed in the middle of each of the vaults served the purpose of letting in sunlight and fresh air, while also letting out smoke. As mentioned earlier, these are the only other areas of the caravanserai that have ornamentation besides the decoration found at the entry vestibule.

The caravanserai was restored during the years 1956–1959. The ruins of a structure east of the vestibule was formerly believed to be a church. This identification was disproved by archaeological excavations in 2014, although evidence on this building's actual purpose was inconclusive.

Gallery

See Also 
List of caravanserais in Armenia

References

External links 

 Armeniapedia.org: Selim Caravanserai
 About Selim caravanserai

Caravanserais in Armenia
Tourist attractions in Vayots Dzor Province
Buildings and structures completed in 1332
Buildings and structures in Vayots Dzor Province